Verkhneye Anisimovo is a rural locality (a village) in Opokskoye Rural Settlement, Velikoustyugsky District, Vologda Oblast, Russia. The population was 105 as of 2002.

Geography 
Verkhneye Anisimovo is located 54 km southwest of Veliky Ustyug (the district's administrative centre) by road. Nizhneye Anisimovo is the nearest rural locality.

References 

Rural localities in Velikoustyugsky District